Jacques Salomon Hadamard  (8 December 1865 – 17 October 1963) was a French mathematician who made major contributions in number theory, complex analysis, differential geometry and partial differential equations.

Biography
The son of a teacher, Amédée Hadamard, of Jewish descent, and Claire Marie Jeanne Picard, Hadamard was born in Versailles, France and attended the Lycée Charlemagne and Lycée Louis-le-Grand, where his father taught. In 1884 Hadamard entered the École Normale Supérieure, having placed first in the entrance examinations both there and at the École Polytechnique. His teachers included Tannery, Hermite, Darboux, Appell, Goursat and Picard.

In 1892 Hadamard married Louise-Anna Trénel, also of Jewish descent, with whom he had three sons and two daughters. The following year he took up a lectureship in the University of Bordeaux, where he proved his celebrated inequality on determinants, which led to the discovery of Hadamard matrices when equality holds. In 1896 he made two important contributions: he proved the prime number theorem, using complex function theory (also proved independently by Charles Jean de la Vallée-Poussin); and he was awarded the Bordin Prize of the French Academy of Sciences for his work on geodesics in the differential geometry of surfaces and dynamical systems. In the same year he was appointed Professor of Astronomy and Rational Mechanics in Bordeaux. His foundational work on geometry and symbolic dynamics continued in 1898 with the study of geodesics on surfaces of negative curvature. For his cumulative work, he was awarded the Prix Poncelet in 1898.

After the Dreyfus affair, which involved him personally because his second cousin Lucie was the wife of Dreyfus, Hadamard became politically active and a staunch supporter of Jewish causes though he professed to be an atheist in his religion.

In 1897 he moved back to Paris, holding positions in the Sorbonne and the Collège de France, where he was appointed Professor of Mechanics in 1909. In addition to this post, he was appointed to chairs of analysis at the École Polytechnique in 1912 and at the École Centrale in 1920, succeeding Jordan and Appell. In Paris Hadamard concentrated his interests on the problems of mathematical physics, in particular partial differential equations, the calculus of variations and the foundations of functional analysis. He introduced the idea of well-posed problem and the method of descent in the theory of partial differential equations, culminating in his seminal book on the subject, based on lectures given at Yale University in 1922. Later in his life he wrote on probability theory and mathematical education.

Hadamard was elected to the French Academy of Sciences in 1916, in succession to Poincaré, whose complete works he helped edit. He became foreign member of the Royal Netherlands Academy of Arts and Sciences in 1920. He was elected a foreign member of the Academy of Sciences of the USSR in 1929. He visited the Soviet Union in 1930 and 1934 and China in 1936 at the invitation of Soviet and Chinese mathematicians.

Hadamard stayed in France at the beginning of the Second World War and escaped to southern France in 1940. The Vichy government permitted him to leave for the United States in 1941 and he obtained a visiting position at Columbia University in New York. He moved to London in 1944 and returned to France when the war ended in 1945.

Hadamard was awarded an honorary doctorate (LL.D.) by Yale University in October 1901, during celebrations for the bicentenary of the university. He was awarded the CNRS Gold medal for his lifetime achievements in 1956. He died in Paris in 1963, aged ninety-seven.

Hadamard's students included Maurice Fréchet, Paul Lévy, Szolem Mandelbrojt and André Weil.

On creativity

In his book Psychology of Invention in the Mathematical Field, Hadamard uses the results of introspection to study mathematical thought processes, and tries to report and interpret observations, personal or gathered from other scholars engaged in the work of invention. In sharp contrast to authors who identify language and cognition, he describes his own mathematical thinking as largely wordless, often accompanied by mental images that represent the entire solution to a problem. He surveyed 100 of the leading physicists of the day (approximately 1900), asking them how they did their work.

Hadamard described the experiences of the mathematicians/theoretical physicists Carl Friedrich Gauss, Hermann von Helmholtz, Henri Poincaré and others as viewing entire solutions with "sudden spontaneousness".

Hadamard described the process as having four steps of the five-step Graham Wallas creative process model, with the first three also having been put forth by Helmholtz: Preparation, Incubation, Illumination, and Verification.

Publications

 An Essay on the Psychology of Invention in the Mathematical Field.
Le problème de Cauchy et les équations aux dérivées partielles linéaires hyperboliques, Hermann 1932 (Lectures given at Yale, Eng. trans. Lectures on Cauchy's problem in linear partial differential equations, Yale University Press, Oxford University Press 1923, Reprint Dover 2003)
La série de Taylor et son prolongement analytique, 2nd edn., Gauthier-Villars 1926
La théorie des équations aux dérivées partielles, Peking, Editions Scientifiques, 1964
Leçons sur le calcul des variations, Vol. 1, Paris, Hermann 1910, Online
Leçons sur la propagation des ondes et les équations de l'hydrodynamique, Paris, Hermann 1903, Online
Four lectures on Mathematics, delivered at Columbia University 1911, Columbia University Press 1915 (1. The definition of solutions of linear partial differential equations by boundary conditions, 2. Contemporary researches in differential equations, integral equations and integro-differential equations, 3. Analysis Situs in connection with correspondences and differential equations, 4. Elementary solutions of partial differential equations and Greens functions), Online
Leçons de géométrie élémentaire, 2 vols., Paris, Colin, 1898, 1906 (Eng. trans: Lessons in Geometry, American Mathematical Society 2008), Vol. 1, Vol. 2
Cours d'analyse professé à l'École polytechnique, 2 vols., Paris, Hermann 1925/27, 1930 (Vol. 1: Compléments de calcul différentiel, intégrales simples et multiples, applications analytiques et géométriques, équations différentielles élémentaires, Vol. 2: Potentiel, calcul des variations, fonctions analytiques, équations différentielles et aux dérivées partielles, calcul des probabilités)
Essai sur l'étude des fonctions données par leur développement de Taylor. Étude sur les propriétés des fonctions entières et en particulier d'une fonction considérée par Riemann, 1893, Online

Sur la distribution des zéros de la fonction  et ses conséquences arithmétiques, Bulletin de la Société Mathématique de France, Vol. 24, 1896, pp. 199–220 Online

See also
List of things named after Jacques Hadamard

References

Further reading
 
.

External links

 
 

1865 births
1963 deaths
19th-century French mathematicians
20th-century French mathematicians
École Normale Supérieure alumni
Academic staff of the Collège de France
Columbia University faculty
French atheists
Jewish atheists
19th-century French Jews
French pacifists
Lycée Louis-le-Grand alumni
Members of the French Academy of Sciences
Foreign Members of the Royal Society
Corresponding Members of the Russian Academy of Sciences (1917–1925)
Corresponding Members of the USSR Academy of Sciences
Members of the Royal Netherlands Academy of Arts and Sciences
Foreign associates of the National Academy of Sciences
Number theorists
PDE theorists
People from Versailles
Academic staff of the University of Paris
Textbook writers
Academic staff of École Polytechnique
Academic staff of the University of Bordeaux